Leopoldo Ledesma (born 20 July 1903, date of death unknown) was an Argentine middle-distance runner. He competed in the men's 800 metres at the 1928 Summer Olympics.

References

1903 births
Year of death missing
Athletes (track and field) at the 1928 Summer Olympics
Argentine male middle-distance runners
Olympic athletes of Argentina
Place of birth missing